Donald Douglas is an American physician and politician serving as a member of the Kentucky Senate from the 22nd district. He assumed office on November 18, 2021.

Early life and education 
Douglas was raised in Owensboro, Kentucky in a family of 16 children. After graduating from Daviess County High School, Douglas earned a Bachelor of Science degree in biology from Western Kentucky University and a Doctor of Medicine from the University of Kentucky College of Medicine. He completed medical internships at the University of Kentucky and Saint Elizabeth Hospital in Utica, New York.

Career 
Outside of politics, Douglas works as medical director and lead physician at the Tony Delk IMAC Regeneration Center in Lexington, Kentucky. He was elected to the Kentucky Senate in a November 2021 special election. When he assumed office, he became the first African-American Republican state senator in Kentucky.

Personal life 
A former track and field athlete, Douglas participated in the 1980 and 1984 United States Olympic trials. During the 1980s, Douglas was one of the world's top athletes in the 400 meter hurdle event.

References 

Living people
Republican Party Kentucky state senators
African-American state legislators in Kentucky
Physicians from Kentucky
Western Kentucky University alumni
University of Kentucky College of Medicine alumni
American anesthesiologists
People from Owensboro, Kentucky
20th-century African-American physicians
20th-century American physicians
21st-century African-American physicians
21st-century American physicians
21st-century African-American politicians
21st-century American politicians
Year of birth missing (living people)